CFO India is a magazine for India CFOs community published monthly by 9.9 Media.

History and profile
CFO India was launched in November 2009, on the second anniversary of the parent firm, 9.9 Media. The magazine is published on a monthly basis. Anuradha Das Mathur was the founding editor of the magazine.

References

External links
 Official website

2009 establishments in Delhi
9.9 Media Products
Business magazines published in India
Magazines established in 2009
English-language magazines published in India
Monthly magazines published in India
Magazines published in Delhi